18S rRNA (adenine1779-N6/adenine1780-N6)-dimethyltransferase (18S rRNA dimethylase Dim1p, Dim1p, ScDim1, m2(6)A dimethylase, KIDIM1) is an enzyme with systematic name S-adenosyl-L-methionine:18S rRNA (adenine1779-N6/adenine1780-N6)-dimethyltransferase. This enzyme catalyses the following chemical reaction

 4 S-adenosyl-L-methionine + adenine1779/adenine1780 in 18S rRNA  4 S-adenosyl-L-homocysteine + N6-dimethyladenine1779/N6-dimethyladenine1780 in 18S rRNA

DIM1 is involved in pre-rRNA processing.

References

External links 
 

EC 2.1.1